Philip "Phil" Sutton (born 4 May 1960, Ebbw Vale, Wales) is a former Welsh badminton player.

Career
Phil Sutton won the Welsh badminton nationals singles title 6 times in row between 1979 and 1985. During his career Sutton won the 1983 Peruvian Open men's singles and doubles titles in Lima. Sutton also reached the quarter finals of the men's singles 1983 All England Championships at Wembley and the last 16 of the 1983 World Championships in Denmark losing to Morten Frost in both events.

In 1984 Phil Sutton partnered with Jane Webster of England (she is now his wife) and reached the semifinals of the Indonesian Open mixed doubles. In 1987 Phil won the Swiss Open men's singles title. 
Sutton represented Wales 87 times in international matches and competed for Wales in two Commonwealth Games, 1982 Australia and in 1986 Scotland.

All-England 
Men's Singles 
Quarter Finals 1983 , Lost to Morten Frost 
Last 16 ,  1979, Lost to Fleming Delfs 
Mixed doubles 
Quarter Finals  with Jane Webster 1981 , Lost to Thomas Kilstrom and Gillian Gilks

IBF International 
Men's singles

Men's Doubles

References

External links
 Philip Sutton profile

Sportspeople from Ebbw Vale
Welsh male badminton players
Badminton players at the 1982 Commonwealth Games
Commonwealth Games competitors for Wales
1960 births
Living people